The Sterntalerhof is a children's hospice established in 1999.

Deacon Peter Kai and Psychotherapist Regina Heimhilcher  the Sterntalerhof, bought a small farm in Burgenland, Austria, and began work in 1999 as an independent nonprofit charity association. Their vision was to support every family which is in psychosocial exception on grounds of a life-threatening and life-limiting Illness of their children. The organization is intended as a harborage (original meaning of hospice), a place for recovery where hope can grow anew.

The Sterntalerhof follows three principles:

 Holistic guidance of families with children who are seriously, chronically, or terminally ill
 In a dignified and natural atmosphere
 By an inter-disciplinary team emphasizing "horse therapy"

The hospice directly cares for more than a hundred children with their families per year and helps families cope with home life via a mobile supply system.

Public Recognition
As the Sterntalerhof is funded through donations and has received several accolades:

 Tax deductibility 2009
 Austrian Health Prize 2010
 Peter Kai elected "Austrian of the year" for his humanitarian commitment 2009
 Austrian donation seal of quality 2012 

The Sterntalerhof supports of the "Vienna Charity Run".<ref[>https://vienna-charityrun.at/sterntalerhof.html]</ref>

References

External links

 

Charities based in Austria
Hospices